is a manga by Hideo Azuma and published by East Press in Japan in March 2005. The manga is a somewhat-fictionalized autobiography of part of the author's life and of his alcohol dependency problems. It has received multiple awards inside and outside Japan.  In addition to being published in Japan, this book has been licensed and published in English, French, Spanish, German, Italian, Russian and Polish.

Reception
2005: Grand Prize, Manga Division, 9th Japan Media Arts Awards
2006: Grand Prize, Tezuka Osamu Cultural Prize
2008: Selection, Angoulême International Comics Festival
2009: Nominee, Ignatz Award, Outstanding Graphic Novel, Small Press Expo

About.com's Deb Aoki lists Disappearance Diary as the best new one-shot manga of 2008 along with Solanin.

References

External links

Review at Anime News Network

2005 manga
Hideo Azuma
Winner of Tezuka Osamu Cultural Prize (Grand Prize)
Manga creation in anime and manga 
Works about alcoholism
Autobiographical anime and manga